Andy Olson (born November 6, 1952) is a Republican politician from the U.S. state of Oregon. He served in the Oregon House of Representatives for District 15, representing parts of Linn and Benton counties, including the city of Albany. Olson served as co-speaker pro tempore in the 76th Oregon Legislative Assembly with Democrat Tina Kotek due to a power-sharing arrangement in the evenly divided Oregon House.

Early life and career
Olson was born in Norfolk, Nebraska. He earned an Associate of Arts in Law Enforcement from Chemeketa Community College and a BA in Human Resources Management from George Fox University. In 1978, Olson became an Oregon State Police Officer and was stationed all over the state, eventually serving as Lieutenant and Station Commander in Albany, McMinnville, and Beaverton. He retired from the state police in 2007. Olson continues to teach public safety with a focus on leadership and character at Linn–Benton Community College.

Political career
In 2004, incumbent Republican Betsy Close announced that she would not seek re-election in district 15, while simultaneously endorsing Olson as her successor. Olson defeated Democrat Wes Price to win election in November and has since been re-elected six times.

In February 2018, Olson announced that he would not seek another term in office and that he would retire as of the end of the current term in January 2019. Including his 30 years with the Oregon State Police, Olson devoted almost 44 years to public service.

Personal life
Olson and his wife Pam have three children and live in Albany.

References

External links
 Legislative website
 Project VoteSmart biography

Republican Party members of the Oregon House of Representatives
People from Norfolk, Nebraska
People from Albany, Oregon
Living people
American state police officers
1952 births
George Fox University alumni
Oregon police officers
21st-century American politicians